South American records in athletics are the best marks set in an event by an athlete who competes for a member nation of the CONSUDATLE. The organisation is responsible for ratification and it analyses each record before approving it. Records may be set in any continent and at any competition, providing that the correct measures are in place (such as wind-gauges) to allow for a verifiable and legal mark.

Outdoor

Key to tables:

+ = en route to longer distance

h = hand timing

NWI = no wind reading

at = automatic timing

X = unratified due to doping violation

A = affected by altitude

a = aided road course according to IAAF rule 260.28

# = not officially ratified by CONSUDATLE and IAAF

Men

Women

Mixed

Indoor

Men

Women

Notes

References
General
CONSUDATLE:South American Records 28 September 2022 updated
Specific

External links
World Athletics: South American Records